James Thomas Norman (born January 2, 1934) is a former American football offensive lineman in the National Football League for the Washington Redskins.  He did not attend college.

1934 births
Living people
Sportspeople from Hampton, Virginia
American football offensive tackles
Washington Redskins players
Hamilton Tiger-Cats players